Thiago Monteiro was the defending champion but chose not to defend his title.

Nicolas Moreno de Alboran won the title after defeating Matheus Pucinelli de Almeida 6–2, 6–4 in the final.

Seeds

Draw

Finals

Top half

Bottom half

References

External links
Main draw
Qualifying draw

Braga Open - 1